The nine Queensland GPS boys' schools have competed in an annual Rugby Union premiership since 1918 (changing to Rugby league in 1920, until the schools reverted to Rugby Union in 1928).

The winners of each year are as follows:

References

Rugby union competitions in Queensland